Sophia Adriana Juliette de Vries-de Boer (19 June 1882 – 11 February 1944) was a Dutch actress. She was active in theatre and film between 1894 and 1942. She was murdered in the Auschwitz concentration camp in 1944.

Selected filmography
Op hoon van zegen (1934)

References

External links

1882 births
1944 deaths
Actors from Rotterdam
Dutch stage actresses
Dutch film actresses
19th-century Dutch actresses
20th-century Dutch actresses
Dutch civilians killed in World War II
Dutch people who died in Auschwitz concentration camp